Krzówka  is a village in the administrative district of Gmina Serokomla, within Łuków County, Lublin Voivodeship, in eastern Poland. It has a primary school with under 100 pupils.

In 1827 it had 33 houses and 171 inhabitants; in 1883 it had decreased to 15 houses and 90 inhabitants.

References

Villages in Łuków County